Kelli Amanda Goss (born February 1, 1992) is an American film and television actress. She began her career appearing in a recurring roles in the Nickelodeon comedy series Big Time Rush (2010–13) and on the CBS daytime soap opera The Young and the Restless (2013–15). From 2016 to 2020, Goss played the role of Heather Roth in the Netflix comedy series The Ranch. Most recently, she played main character Vanessa on the CBS sitcom United States of Al.

Life and career
Goss was born in Valencia, California. Her first television role was on the NBC sitcom My Name is Earl in 2007, then she appeared in United States of Tara in 2009. In 2010, she was cast in the role of Jennifer 2 on the Nickelodeon comedy series Big Time Rush, substituting temporarily for Spencer Locke  while Locke was filming Resident Evil: Afterlife. Locke would return in the middle of the second season after finishing with the recording of the movie, however she reversed the decision because many people prefer the interpretation of Goss.

In 2012, Goss starred in the Lifetime movie Sexting in Suburbia, along with Liz Vassey, Jenn Proske and Ryan Kelley. Also that year, she had appeared on the Nick at Nite prime time soap opera Hollywood Heights as Hunter King's onscreen friend. In 2013, Goss was cast in the CBS daytime soap opera The Young and the Restless as Courtney Sloane, an undercover cop who becomes engaged to Noah Newman before her on screen death on April 6, 2015. The character was well received by critics.

In 2016 Goss began appearing in a recurring role as Heather Roth in the Netflix comedy series The Ranch with Ashton Kutcher, Danny Masterson, Debra Winger and Sam Elliott. The series ended in 2020. 

Goss was cast in a lead role for the new CBS sitcom United States of Al, which premiered on April 1, 2021 surrounded with controversy. Released to mostly negative reviews, United States of Al and its makers were criticized for the show’s humor, use of antiquated tropes, and in particular, critics called out the casting of a South-African-born Indian actor to play an Afghan lead and his use of an inauthentic accent.

Filmography

References

External links

1992 births
Living people
American child actresses
American film actresses
American television actresses
Actresses from Santa Clarita, California
Actresses from California
21st-century American actresses
People from Valencia, Santa Clarita, California